Beech is a surname and may refer to:

 Albert Beech (1912–1985), English footballer
 Charlie Beech (born 1987), English rugby union player
 Chris Beech (born 1974), English former footballer
 Chris Beech (footballer, born 1975), English former footballer
 David Beech (born 1954), curator of the British Library's philatelic collection
 Elaine Beech (born 1960), American politician
 Graham Beech (died 1993), English rower
 Hannah Beech, journalist for Time magazine
 Jim Beech, English footballer between 1894 and 1902
 Kenny Beech (born 1958), English former footballer
 Kris Beech (born 1981), Canadian ice hockey player in Sweden
 Loren Beech (born 2002), American singer and social media personality
 Mark Beech (writer), English writer and rock critic 
 Matt Beech (born 1972), American former Major League Baseball pitcher
 Olive Ann Beech (1904–1993), U.S. aviation pioneer and businesswoman, wife of Walter Beech
 Sandra Beech (born c. 1942), Canadian children's musician
 Terry Beech (born 1980 or 1981), Canadian politician
 Walter Beech (1891–1950), American pioneer aviator
 William George Beech (1898–1971), Canadian politician

English-language surnames